InterNICHE (International Network for Humane Education), is a non-profit organization and an international network based in the United Kingdom that promotes the use of humane alternatives within biological science and veterinary medical education globally. The network is composed of campaigners, students, teachers and trainers.

Resource
Resources developed by InterNICHE to highlight alternatives in biological sciences of the multi-language book From Guinea Pig to Computer Mouse (2003), several Alternative Loan Systems, the Humane Education Award. The organizazion also has a website www.interniche.org, conferences, outreach visits and training around the world.

See also
 Alternatives to animal testing

References

Sources
 Patricia Ann Owens. Encyclopedia of animal rights and animal welfare. School Library Journal. vol. 56 iss. 4 p. 10.

External links
 

Alternatives to animal testing
Animal welfare organisations based in the United Kingdom
Anti-vivisection organizations
Humane education
Organizations established in 1988